Commonwealth flags may refer to:

The Flag of the Commonwealth of Nations and its predecessor
Flags of the Interregnum (British Isles), the flags used by the Commonwealth of England

See also
Commonwealth (U.S. state), which lists those states' flags
Member states of the Commonwealth of Nations, which lists those states' flags